Herman Joseph Dohrmann (7 September 1873 – 30 October 1957) was a former Australian rules footballer who played with Carlton in the Victorian Football League (VFL).

Dohrmann played with various clubs prior to Carlton, including Carlton Juniors, Collingwood (VFA), and Nth Melbourne (VFA) and Perth (WAFL).

Notes

External links 

Herman Dohrmann's profile at Blueseum

1873 births
Australian rules footballers from Western Australia
Collingwood Football Club (VFA) players
North Melbourne Football Club (VFA) players
Carlton Football Club players
1957 deaths
Australian rules footballers from Melbourne